Odisea is the debut studio album by Puerto Rican reggaeton artist Ozuna. It features collaborations from J Balvin, Anuel AA, Zion & Lennox, Nicky Jam, and De La Ghetto.

It was released on August 25, 2017, through VP Records, Dimelo VI Distribution and Sony Music Latin. The album was supported by seventh singles: " Si No Te Quiere "Dile Que Tú Me Quieres", "Tu Foto", "Bebé", "El Farsante", "Se Preparó", and "Síguelo Bailando". The album debuted at number 22 on the US Billboard 200 and number 1 on the Top Latin Albums chart with first week sales of 18,000.

Track listing

Charts

Weekly charts

Year-end charts

Certifications

Awards and nominations

References

2017 albums
Albums produced by Sky Rompiendo
Ozuna (singer) albums
Sony Music Latin albums
VP Records albums